Ilse Aigner (born 7 December 1964) is a German politician and member of the Christian Social Union of Bavaria (CSU).

Aigner was born in Feldkirchen-Westerham, Bavaria, and entered Angela Merkel's grand coalition cabinet as Federal Minister of Food, Agriculture and Consumer Protection on 31 October 2008. She succeeded Horst Seehofer, who had become Minister President of Bavaria. She left her position on 30 September 2013 after being elected as a member of the Bavarian parliament. 

From 2013, she served as Deputy Minister-President of Bavaria. In addition, she served as State Minister of Economic Affairs; and Media, Energy and Technology (2013–2018) and State Minister of Construction and Transport (2018). After Horst Seehofer resigned as Minister President in order to become Federal Minister of the Interior on 14 March 2018, Aigner became acting Minister President until the election of Markus Söder as Minister President. After the 2018 Bavarian State elections, she was elected as President of the Bavarian Landtag, succeeding longterm president Barbara Stamm who lost her seat in the election.

Education and professional background 

Aigner completed a professional training as a telecommunications technician in 1985 and joined the electrical installation business of her parents. 

In 1990 she graduated from the technical academy with the degree of a State Certified Engineer and worked for several years for Eurocopter in the development of helicopter electric systems.

Aigner was elected first in 1994 to the Bavarian State Parliament.

Member of the German Bundestag, 1998–2013 
From 1998 Aigner was a member of the German Bundestag, winning always an absolute majority of the votes in her electoral district.

From 2002 to 2005, she was a member of the Budget Committee, where she served as her parliamentary group's rapporteur on the budgets of the Federal Ministry for Consumer Protection, Food and Agriculture (BMELV) and the aerospace technology portfolio of the Federal Ministry of Education and Research (BMBF). From 2005 to 2008, she served as her parliamentary group’s spokesperson for education and research policy.

Federal Minister for Consumer Protection, Food and Agriculture, 2008–2013 
Aigner was a little-known member of parliament with no previous ministerial experience when she took over as Federal Minister for Consumer Protection, Food and Agriculture in the cabinet of Chancellor Angela Merkel in 2008, replacing Horst Seehofer.

During her time in office, Aigner steered through a 2011 dioxins scare that saw contaminated eggs and meat from Germany going to six neighbouring countries. In response, she imposed tough new safety standards for animal feed manufacturers, a move widely supported in the market to retain public confidence. 

She took a tough line against cultivation of genetically modified organisms (GMOs) in Germany but received praise from commodity traders when she supported imports of GMOs approved in the United States and South America to secure German supplies of soybeans for animal feed. Meanwhile, she repeatedly expressed concern that outside financial investment in agricultural commodity markets distorts prices, instead calling for more transparency in commodity markets and clear visibility of the difference between futures investment by industrial food buyers and financial investors.

In 2009, Aigner caused a controversy when she called for requirements to publish the names and location of recipients of Common Agricultural Policy (CAP) subsidies to be “suspended” until the implications for data protection have been assessed. In response, the European Commissioner for Agriculture and Rural Development Mariann Fischer Boel threatened Germany with legal action.

Aigner has been outspoken in her criticism of Facebook, which she has said needs to do to protect its users' privacy. 
 
In September 2011, she asked all federal ministers in Germany not to use Facebook for public relations and communication. In 2010, she criticized Google over plans to give property owners a four-week deadline to stop their buildings from showing up on the company's then newly launched Street View mapping service, demanding that all requests be considered instead.

Amid the German debate on the country's energy transition to an energy portfolio dominated by renewable energy, Aigner called in later 2012 for the partial nationalization of the country's electrical grid in order to ensure that high-voltage power lines required to transport green energy from offshore windfarms and other sources to the industry-heavy regions of southern Germany are built.

In 2012, Aigner announced she would leave her post to return to local politics in her home state of Bavaria following the 2013 national elections, prompting speculation that she was eyeing the post of Bavarian Minister-President Horst Seehofer.

Deputy Minister-President of Bavaria, 2013–2018
Following her return to Bavaria after the state's 2013 elections, Aigner was named Minister-President Horst Seehofer's deputy as well as Bavarian Minister for Economic Affairs, Media, Energy and Technology. As one of Bavaria's representatives at the Bundesrat, she served on the Committee on Cultural Affairs; the Committee on Economic Affairs; and the Committee on the Environment, Nature Protection and Reactor Safety.

In the negotiations to form a grand coalition following the 2013 national elections, Aigner led the CDU/CSU delegation in the working group on economic affairs; her co-chair from the SPD was Hubertus Heil. On 17 December 2013, she became the first woman to ever chair a meeting of the Bavarian State Government.

In the cabinet of Minister-President Markus Söder, Aigner briefly served as State Minister of Construction and Transport in 2018. On the Bundesrat, she became a member of the Committee on Transport and of the Committee on Urban Development, Housing and Regional Planning.

President of the Bavarian Landtag, 2018–present
On 5 November 2018, Aigner was elected with 198 of 205 votes as new President of the Bavarian Landtag.

Other activities

Regulatory bodies
 Bavarian Regulatory Authority for Commercial Broadcasting (BLM), Ex-Officio Chairwoman of the Supervisory Board (2013–2018)
 Federal Network Agency for Electricity, Gas, Telecommunications, Posts and Railway, Ex-Officio Member of the Advisory Board (2013–2018)

Corporate boards
 FilmFernsehFonds Bayern, Ex-Officio Chairwoman of the Supervisory Board (2013–2018)
 LfA Förderbank Bayern, Ex-Officio Member of the Supervisory Board (2013–2018)
 Messe München, Ex-Officio Chairwoman of the Supervisory Board (2013–2018)
 Landwirtschaftliche Rentenbank, Ex-Officio Member of the Supervisory Board (2005–2013)
 KfW, Ex-Officio Member of the Supervisory Board (2008–2013)

Non-profit organizations
 Hanns Seidel Foundation, Member of the Board
 Bayerischer Rundfunk (BR), Member of the Supervisory Board (since 2018)
 Deutsches Museum, Member of the Board of Trustees (since 2004) 
 Ifo Institute for Economic Research, Member of the Board of Trustees
 Helmholtz Association of German Research Centres, Ex-Officio Member of the Senate
 Technical University of Munich (TUM), Member of the Board of Trustees
 Bavarian Research Foundation, Ex-Officio Member of the Board of Trustees (2013–2018)
 Max Planck Society, Ex-Officio Member of the Senate (2013–2018)
 Munich International Film Festival, Ex-Officio Member of the Supervisory Board (2013–2018
 Association of the German Army (FKH), Member of the Presidium (2002–2008)
 German Energy Agency (DENA), Ex-Officio Member of the Supervisory Board (2005–2011)
 Max Planck Institute for Astrophysics, Member of the Board of Trustees (2005–2008)
 Max Planck Institute for Extraterrestrial Physics, Member of the Board of Trustees (2005–2008)
 Wasserwacht of the Bavarian Red Cross, Chairwoman (2001–2009)

Personal life
Aigner is a Roman Catholic. She is single and has no children.

References

Further reading
  Ilse Aigner, Offener Brief an Zuckerberg, "Privates muss privat bleiben", Spiegel Online 2010, 5 April 2010.

External links

Official Website 
sustainable development

|-

|-

|-

1964 births
Living people
Agriculture ministers of Germany
Women ministers of State Governments in Germany
Women federal government ministers of Germany
Ministers of the Bavaria State Government
Presidents of the Landtag of Bavaria
Members of the Landtag of Bavaria
Members of the Bundestag 2009–2013
Members of the Bundestag 2005–2009
Members of the Bundestag 2002–2005
Members of the Bundestag 1998–2002
Members of the Bundestag for the Christian Social Union in Bavaria
Female members of the Bundestag
Members of the Bundestag for Bavaria
21st-century German women politicians
People from Rosenheim (district)
German Roman Catholics
20th-century German women